Power index may refer to:
 Banzhaf power index
 Shapley–Shubik power index